The 1999–2000 Chicago Blackhawks season was the Chicago Blackhawks' 74th season of operation. Finishing 11th in the Western Conference, they did not qualify for the playoffs.

Offseason
Forward Doug Gilmour was named team captain.

Regular season

The Blackhawks tied the Atlanta Thrashers for the most short-handed goals allowed during the regular season, with 13. Captain Doug Gilmour is traded in March to the Buffalo Sabres. The team completes the season without a captain.

Final standings

Schedule and results

Player statistics

Regular season
Scoring

Goaltending

Awards and records

Transactions

Draft picks
Chicago's draft picks at the 1999 NHL Entry Draft held at the FleetCenter in Boston, Massachusetts.

See also
1999–2000 NHL season

References
 

Chic
Chic
Chicago Blackhawks seasons
Chic
Chic